Juan Carlos Masnik Hornos (2 March 1943 – 23 February 2021) was a Uruguayan football player and manager, who represented the Uruguay national team at the 1974 FIFA World Cup in Germany.

Career
Masnik played for Club Nacional de Football and featured in the 1971 Intercontinental Cup. He played in Argentina for Gimnasia y Esgrima de La Plata where he scored 6 goals in 88 league games.

He also had two short stints in the United States.  The first was in 1967 with the New York Skyliners of the United Soccer Association and in the second in 1975 with New York Cosmos of the North American Soccer League.

Masnik made 26 appearances for the Uruguay national team from 1967 to 1974.

Death
Masnik died on 23 February 2021, aged 77.

References

External links

 USA/NASL stats

1943 births
2021 deaths
Uruguayan people of Polish descent
Uruguayan footballers
Association football defenders
Uruguay international footballers
Uruguayan expatriate footballers
1974 FIFA World Cup players
Uruguayan Primera División players
Club Nacional de Football players
Argentine Primera División players
Club de Gimnasia y Esgrima La Plata footballers
North American Soccer League (1968–1984) players
New York Cosmos players
Uruguayan football managers
Uruguayan expatriate sportspeople in Argentina
Uruguayan expatriate sportspeople in Chile
Uruguayan expatriate sportspeople in the United States
Expatriate footballers in Argentina
Expatriate footballers in Chile
Expatriate soccer players in the United States
Expatriate football managers in El Salvador
United Soccer Association players
C.D. Luis Ángel Firpo managers
C.D. FAS managers